Glass is a 2019 American superhero film written and directed by M. Night Shyamalan, who also produced with Jason Blum, Marc Bienstock, and Ashwin Rajan. The film is a crossover and sequel to Shyamalan's previous films Unbreakable (2000) and Split (2016) and the third and final installment in the Unbreakable trilogy. Bruce Willis, Samuel L. Jackson, Spencer Treat Clark, and Charlayne Woodard reprise their Unbreakable roles, while James McAvoy and Anya Taylor-Joy return as their Split characters, with Sarah Paulson, Adam David Thompson, and Luke Kirby joining the cast. The film sees David Dunn / The Overseer as he and Kevin Wendell Crumb / The Horde are captured and placed in a psychiatric facility with Elijah Price / Mr. Glass, where they contemplate the authenticity of their superhuman powers.

Despite interest in a sequel to Unbreakable, The Walt Disney Studios' Touchstone Pictures opted not to finance one. Shyamalan set out to write Split using a character he had written for Unbreakable but pulled from its script due to balance issues. He realized the opportunity he had to create a trilogy of works, and used the ending of Split to establish the film as within the Unbreakable narrative. This necessitated securing the rights to use both Willis' and Jackson's Unbreakable characters from Disney, with the promise of including the studio within the film alongside Universal Pictures. Split was a financial and critical success, and by April 2017 Shyamalan announced that he started the production process for Glass.

The film had its world premiere in select Alamo Drafthouse Cinema theaters on January 12, 2019, and was released in the United States on January 18 by Universal Pictures. Glass received mixed reviews from critics, who found the film "disappointing" and "underwhelming" due to the story, particularly the third act, but praised the performances of the cast; many deemed it the weakest in the trilogy. The film was a financial success, grossing $247 million worldwide against a $20 million production budget.

Plot
David Dunn / the Overseer and his son Joseph track down the Horde to an abandoned factory where he has four cheerleaders hostage to feed to the Beast, a superhuman personality the Horde all worship. Dunn rescues the cheerleaders and has a brief confrontation with the Beast until they are captured by Dr. Ellie Staple. Staple is part of an unknown clandestine organization that specializes in convincing those who believe they are superhuman that they are instead delusional. They are taken to Raven Hill Memorial where a sedated Elijah Price / Mr. Glass, whom Dunn previously fought over a decade ago, is being held. 

David and Kevin are placed in separate rooms that contain unique security measures based on their weaknesses of water and light flashes, respectively. Staple explains that she believes that they suffer from delusions of grandeur and do not have superpowers. Mrs. Price, Elijah's mother; Joseph Dunn; and Casey Cooke, a victim who survived The Horde's captivity, all try and fail to convince Staple that superhumans are real. As part of her final evaluation, Staple brings the three men to a room where she challenges them with explanations for their seemingly superhuman abilities that are not supernatural. David and several of Kevin's personalities become confused and distraught, while Elijah remains catatonic.

That night, Elijah escapes from his room and conducts research on The Overseer and The Horde. He visits Kevin and says he has been feigning his sedated state and plans to escape the institute, but he requires the help of The Beast to do so. The next morning, Staple sees surveillance footage of Elijah outside his room and performs a prefrontal lobotomy-type procedure on him. When he is alone with his caretaker, Elijah kills the man, revealing the procedure was unsuccessful because Elijah had sabotaged the surgical laser. He frees Kevin and then manipulates David into using his strength to break out of his room by relating a plan for The Beast to reveal himself to the world at the opening of the Osaka Tower, a new skyscraper in Philadelphia, while Elijah destroys a chemical lab in the building, potentially killing thousands.

Mrs. Price, Casey, and Joseph arrive at Raven Hill just as Elijah, Kevin, and David escape. Staple, also witnessing the fight, decides to call the authorities to move in on the superhumans. David and The Beast fight in the Raven Hill parking lot for a while before Elijah tells The Beast that David's weakness is water, at which point Joseph reveals that Kevin's father died in the train wreck that Elijah caused. The Beast thanks Elijah for contributing to his creation by making it so that Kevin was raised solely by his abusive mother before mortally wounding him for manipulating the situation that led to Kevin's abuse. He throws David into a water storage tank, but David is able to break through the side, drenching the surrounding area. Casey manages to bring Kevin's dormant original personality into the "light", at which point a sniper fatally shoots him, and Kevin dies in Casey's arms. While a SWAT officer drowns David in a flooded pothole, Staple reveals she is part of a clandestine organization that has been suppressing the existence of superhumans for millennia by tracking and killing those with superhuman abilities, as they see such individuals as a threat to the stability of the world order.
 
In the aftermath, Staple deletes the surveillance footage of the confrontation and makes plans to move on to investigate the next case of suspected superhumans. However, when she overhears a group of comic book nerds discussing the tropes of a super-genius mastermind, she realizes Elijah must have had a secret plan and discovers he arranged for the Raven Hill surveillance footage of the fight to be live-streamed to a private website, leaving her and her organization defeated. Mrs. Price, Joseph, and Casey each receive a copy of the footage and release it to the public, finally exposing the existence of superhumans.

Cast
 James McAvoy as Kevin Wendell Crumb / The Horde: A 24-year-old former Philadelphia Zoo employee with 24 different personalities whose body chemistry changes with each personality, including a personality known as "The Beast"—a sadistic superhuman cannibal whose abilities include wall-crawling and enhanced strength, speed, durability, and agility.
 Owen Vitullo portrays an 8-year-old Kevin.
 Bruce Willis as David Dunn / The Overseer: A superhuman vigilante with enhanced strength and durability, as well as the ability to see the crimes people have committed if he touches them. In the film, Dunn goes by a new alias, "The Overseer".
 Colin Becker portrays a 10-year-old David.
 Samuel L. Jackson as Elijah Price / Mr. Glass: A genius wheelchair user, comic book theorist with Type I osteogenesis imperfecta, and mass murderer, who was institutionalized after Dunn discovered his crimes.
 William Turner portrays a young Elijah
 Johnny Hiram Jamison plays a 14-year-old Elijah (via photographs).
 Sarah Paulson as Dr. Ellie Staple: A psychiatrist specializing in delusions of grandeur who treats patients convinced they are superhuman beings and attempts to prove Dunn, Price and Crumb are not superhumans.
 Anya Taylor-Joy as Casey Cooke: A 17-year-old girl with a history of abuse who was kidnapped by one of Kevin's identities as a potential sacrifice to "The Beast", but managed to survive. She is the only person capable of bringing forth Kevin's dormant original/"host" personality.
 Spencer Treat Clark as Joseph Dunn: David's son, who has believed in his father's abilities since he was a child and sees him as a real-life superhero.
 Charlayne Woodard as Mrs. Price: Elijah's mother, who took great care of her son and always told him he was special, no matter what others said.
 Luke Kirby as Pierce: One of Elijah's caretakers at Raven Hill.
 Adam David Thompson as Daryl: An employee at Raven Hill.

M. Night Shyamalan reprises his cameo role of Jai, the security guard at Dr. Fletcher's apartment building, from Split, who recognizes David Dunn and asks him if he used to work at the football stadium, indicating that Jai was the drug dealer David confronted at the stadium in Unbreakable (a part also played by Shyamalan). Shannon Destiny Ryan, Diana Silvers, Nina Wisner, and Kyli Zion portrayed the kidnapped cheerleaders at the start of the film. Rosemary Howard and Bryan McElroy portrayed Kevin's parents, Penelope and Clarence, with Howard reprising her role from Split.

Production

Development
After the release of M. Night Shyamalan's Unbreakable (2000), rumors of possible sequels began circulating in different interviews and on film fansites. At the time, Bruce Willis, who played David Dunn / The Overseer, was quoted as saying he hoped there would be an Unbreakable trilogy, but, in December 2000, Shyamalan denied rumors he had written Unbreakable as the first installment of a trilogy. In August 2001, he stated that, because of successful DVD sales, he had approached Touchstone Pictures about an Unbreakable sequel, but the studio originally declined because of the film's disappointing box office performance.

In September 2008, Shyamalan and star Samuel L. Jackson, who played Elijah Price / Mr. Glass, stated discussions about making a sequel had been largely abandoned in light of the disappointing box office returns. Jackson indicated he was still interested in a sequel, but Shyamalan remained noncommittal. In February 2010, Willis said Shyamalan was "still thinking about doing the fight movie between me and Sam" and stated that, as long as Jackson was able to participate, he would be "up for it".

Shyamalan worked on various unrelated films after Unbreakable before releasing Split (2016), which introduces the split-personality character Kevin Wendell Crumb / The Horde, played by James McAvoy. Crumb had been included in the initial script of Unbreakable, but Shyamalan felt the character created balancing issues and removed him from the story (Shyamalan has said "a bunch" of the scenes in Split were originally written for Unbreakable). In the final scene of Split, Willis' Dunn is seen learning about the escape of The Horde and thereby realizing that other superhumans exist, as predicted by Jackson's Mr. Glass. Unbreakable was produced and owned by Touchstone Pictures, a label of Walt Disney Studios, while Split was produced through Universal Pictures, so Shyamalan had to obtain permission from Disney to use the character of Dunn in Split. He met with Walt Disney Studios president Sean Bailey and came to a gentlemen's agreement, whereby Bailey agreed to allow the use of the character in the film without a fee, and Shyamalan promised that Disney would be involved in a sequel, if it was developed.

Split was met with critical and financial success. In January 2017, Shyamalan stated that, although he hoped a third Unbreakable film would be made and he already had an outline prepared, "I don't know what's going to happen when I go off in my room, a week after this film opens, to write the script." The next month, he affirmed his next film would be the third work in the trilogy. He finished the script by April, at which point he announced the new film would be called Glass and have a target release date of January 18, 2019. Universal was selected to distribute the film in the United States, while Disney distributed the film internationally through its Buena Vista International label.

Shyamalan has been asked numerous times if there will be a sequel to Glass. In January 2019, he officially confirmed that no sequels are currently planned, adding that he has no interest in building a cinematic universe.

Casting
The cast of Glass includes returning actors from each of the previous films in the trilogy (Willis, Jackson, Spencer Treat Clark, and Charlayne Woodard all reprise their respective roles from Unbreakable, and McAvoy and Anya Taylor-Joy reprise their roles from Split), while Sarah Paulson plays a new character. In November 2017, Adam David Thompson joined the cast in a then-undisclosed role.

Filming
As with The Visit (2015) and Split, Shyamalan funded the film himself. Principal photography began on October 2, 2017, in Philadelphia, following a week of rehearsals, with plans for a thirty-nine-day shoot. On October 31, it was reported that Shyamalan would be filming at Allentown State Hospital for a few weeks. On December 12, Shyamalan revealed that four scenes would be shot in January 2018, stating he would have to travel for their filming.

Post-production
Deleted footage from Unbreakable was edited into the film as flashbacks to Elijah and Joseph's childhood.

Music
West Dylan Thordson returned to score the film after his collaboration with Shyamalan on Split. He used themes from James Newton Howard's score for Unbreakable, as well as from his own score for Split, in composing the music for Glass. The score is distributed digitally by Back Lot Music.

Release

Marketing
On April 25, 2018, the film was featured at CinemaCon, with Shyamalan in attendance. He presented footage from the film, along with the first official image featuring Willis, Jackson, and McAvoy in character. He also expressed his intention for the film, saying, "The worlds of Unbreakable and Split finally collide in Glass. What if these real life superheroes and super-villains are somehow locked up together? What could go wrong?" Despite being preceded by hyper-realistic films about superheroes and villains, such as The Dark Knight (2008), Shyamalan personally considered Glass to be the "first truly grounded comic book movie".

On July 12, the first official photographs from production were released publicly, including shots of Samuel L. Jackson, Sarah Paulson, and James McAvoy. A week later, the film was promoted at San Diego Comic-Con, with Shyamalan, Willis, Jackson, Taylor-Joy, and Paulson attending a panel where the film's first trailer premiered. The studio spent a total of $80 million promoting the film.

Theatrical
The first screenings of Glass occurred on January 12, 2019, at 25 Alamo Drafthouse Cinema locations, where it played during a triple-feature event that included and was preceded 
by Unbreakable and Spilt. It was theatrically released on January 18, in the United States and Canada by Universal Pictures, and in international territories by Buena Vista International, a sub-division of Walt Disney Studios Motion Pictures.

Home media
The film was released by Universal Pictures Home Entertainment in the U.S., and Buena Vista Home Entertainment internationally, on digital on April 2, 2019, and on DVD, Blu-ray, and Ultra HD Blu-ray on April 16.

Reception

Box office
Glass grossed $111 million in the United States and Canada and $135.9 million in other territories, for a total worldwide gross of $247 million, against a production budget of $20 million. Deadline Hollywood calculated the film made a net profit of $68 million when factoring together all expenses and revenues.

In the United States and Canada, the film was projected to make $50–75 million from 3,841 theaters over its four-day MLK Day opening weekend. It made $15.9 million on its first day, including $3.7 million from Thursday night previews, and went on to gross $40.3 million in its opening weekend and $46.5 million over the four days, marking the third-best total for Martin Luther King Jr. weekend and of Shyamalan's career. In its second weekend, the film fell 53% to $18.9 million (a steeper drop than Split'''s 35%), but it retained the top spot at the box office. The film again finished its third weekend on top, grossing $9.5 million, before finally being dethroned in its fourth weekend, when it finished fifth with a gross of $6.3 million.

Internationally, the film was expected to gross $45–50 million in its first weekend, for a total of global opening of $105–120 million. It ended up making $48.5 million from international markets, with a global opening of $89.1 million. It finished first in most markets; its highest-grossing countries were Russia ($5.2 million), Mexico ($4.5 million, the best-ever for a Shyamalan film), the United Kingdom ($4.3 million), France ($3.4 million), and South Korea ($2.8 million).

 Critical response 
The website's critical consensus reads: "Glass displays a few glimmers of M. Night Shyamalan at his twisty world-building best, but ultimately disappoints as the conclusion to the writer-director's long-gestating trilogy." On Metacritic,  the film has a weighted average score of 43 out of 100, based on 53 critics, indicating "mixed or average reviews". Audiences polled by CinemaScore gave the film an average grade of "B" on an A+ to F scale, down from Splits "B+", but up from Unbreakables "C", while those at PostTrak gave it an overall positive score of 70% and a "definite recommend" of 49%.

David Ehrlich of IndieWire gave the film a "C−" and called it the biggest disappointment of Shyamalan's career: "The trouble with Glass isn't that its creator sees his own reflection at every turn, or that he goes so far out of his way to contort the film into a clear parable for the many stages of his turbulent career; the trouble with Glass is that its mildly intriguing meta-textual narrative is so much richer and more compelling than the asinine story that Shyamalan tells on its surface." Writing for Rolling Stone, David Fear gave the film three out of five stars: "Glass is not the flaming flop some folks have already suggested it is, nor is it the movie you want in terms of tying ambitious, highfalutin' notions together about how we process our pulp mythos. In a world in which all movies are now either genocide or ice cream, it's a grand gesture characterized by a sense of ambivalence about what you've just seen – which may in and of itself be a sign of failure".

Owen Gleiberman of Variety wrote: "It's good to see Shyamalan back (to a degree) in form, to the extent that he's recovered his basic mojo as a yarn spinner. But Glass occupies us without haunting us; it's more busy than it is stirring or exciting. Maybe that's because revisiting this material feels a touch opportunistic, and maybe it's because the deluge of comic-book movies that now threatens to engulf us on a daily basis has leeched what's left of the mystery out of comics." Richard Roeper of the Chicago Sun-Times said the film had "a distinctive look and some pretty cool moments, and a half-decent twist or two" but that it was mostly "an underwhelming, half-baked, slightly sour, and even off-putting finale." John DeFore of The Hollywood Reporter thought it was "a mixed bag" as a trilogy-closer, saying it does a good job of tying the narrative strands together, but that it tries too hard and fails to provide "something uniquely brainy" to the superhero genre. Joshua Rivera of GQ magazine stated: "The timeline is barely comprehensible, with twists so openly telegraphed they'd have saved the Titanic."

David Sims of The Atlantic compared the film to Batman Returns (1992) and Incredibles 2 (2018): "I appreciate the sheer brashness of Shyamalan's storytelling, which swirls the mythmaking inherent in characters such as David with the emotional scars borne by orphaned characters such as Superman." The cast were praised, in particular McAvoy, who "once again [was] top notch" and "lit up the screen with his eerie physicality every time he appears."

Later director M. Night Shyamalan admit that he cried at bad reviews for Glass'':“Honestly, I was feeling like, ‘Will they never let me be different without throwing me on the garbage pile? The feeling of worthlessness rushed me, and to be honest, it doesn’t ever really leave. But anyway, the film went on, right? It became number one in every country in the world, and it represents my beliefs.”

Accolades

Notes

References

External links 

 
 

2010s American films
2010s English-language films
2010s superhero films
2019 films
2019 psychological thriller films
American crossover films
American psychological thriller films
American sequel films
American superhero films
Blinding Edge Pictures films
Blumhouse Productions films
Buena Vista International films
Films about cannibalism
Films about dissociative identity disorder
Films directed by M. Night Shyamalan
Films produced by Jason Blum
Films produced by M. Night Shyamalan
Films scored by West Dylan Thordson
Films set in Philadelphia
Films set in psychiatric hospitals
Films shot in Allentown, Pennsylvania
Films shot in Philadelphia
Films with screenplays by M. Night Shyamalan
Osteogenesis imperfecta in films
Superhero crossover films
Unbreakable (film series)